Hemimyzon taitungensis (common name: Taitung river loach, in Chinese 臺東間爬岩鰍, 台東間吸鰍, or 石貼仔) is a species of ray-finned fish in the family Balitoridae that is endemic to Taiwan. It is a small (length ) freshwater fish currently known only from running waters of the Central Mountain Range of Taiwan at high and middle elevations. In contrast to H. formosanus, it appears to be a well-defined species with no signs of strong genetic structuring suggestive of cryptic species.

See also
List of protected species in Taiwan
List of endemic species of Taiwan

References

Hemimyzon
Endemic fauna of Taiwan
Freshwater fish of Taiwan
Fish described in 1982
Taxonomy articles created by Polbot